John Tooze FRS (16 May 1938 – 19 May 2021) was a British research scientist,  research administrator, author, science journalist, former executive director of EMBO/EMBC, director of research services at the Cancer Research UK London Research Institute and a vice president at The Rockefeller University.

Early childhood and education
John Tooze was born and grew up in a terraced house on Thornbury Road in Perry Barr, Birmingham where he attended Thornbury Road Primary school. At his second attempt he passed the grammar school entrance exam and joined Handsworth Grammar School in Birmingham. In 1955 in the 6th form he won a State Scholarship and an Open Scholarship from Jesus College, Cambridge (BA, 1961). After leaving Handsworth School in 1955 he decided to spend 6 months working as a laborer in the cooperage of Ansells Brewery, Aston while waiting to begin two years of military service in the Royal Army Educational Corps in September 1956. He was discharged as a sergeant in September 1958 and after obtaining his BA from University of Cambridge he went on to earn a PhD in biophysics from King's College London in 1965  studying in the department where Maurice Wilkins and John Randall worked.

Research and career

Research
Following his PhD, Tooze spent two years working as a postdoctoral researcher working on Bacteriophage genetics with James Watson at Harvard University. He returned to the UK and was appointed a lecturer at King's College London from 1965 to 1968. There he made a series of significant contributions to our understanding of the exocytic and endocytic pathways in neuroendocrine and exocrine cells and the exploitation of these pathways by enveloped animal viruses. He also provided the first evidence that endocytic membranes are used in the morphogenesis of vaccinia and human cytomegalovirus.

Positions with the journal Nature
Beginning in 1966 Tooze had been writing under the byline “our cell biology correspondent” a regular weekly column for the news and views section of the scientific journal Nature. From March 1968 to Sept 1969 he worked full-time as assistant and later as deputy editor working with the editor-in-chief John Maddox.

Research administration
Tooze served as executive secretary of the European Molecular Biology Organization (EMBO) for over 20 years and secretary of the European Molecular Biology Conference (EMBC). In 1982, he founded The EMBO Journal.

Awards and honors
Tooze was awarded the EMBO Gold Medal and EMBO Membership, both in 1986 and was elected a Fellow of the Royal Society (FRS) in 1994.

1986 Elected member of European Molecular Biology Organization (EMBO)
1986 Recipient of EMBO Gold Medal for contributions to promotion of molecular biology in Europe
1993 Elected member of Academia Europaea
1994 Elected Fellow of the Royal Society, UK
2016 Doctor of Science, h.c., Watson School of Biological Sciences, Cold Spring Harbor Laboratory, New York

Timeline 
1938 Born Birmingham, England
1949–1955 Handsworth Grammar School, Birmingham, England
1955 State scholarship
1955 Open scholarship, Jesus College, Cambridge
1956–1958 Military service British Army – final rank sergeant
1958–1961 Jesus College, Cambridge University – B.A. honors
1965 Ph.D. biophysics, University of London
1965–1967 Postdoctoral fellow – J.D. Watson laboratory Harvard University
1961  Staff member MRC Biophysics Unit, King's College, University of London
1963–1968 Lecturer, Department of Biophysics, King's College, University of London
1968–1969 Deputy editor, Nature, London
1970–1973 Research administrator, Imperial Cancer Research Fund (ICRF), Lincoln's Inn Fields, London.
1973–1994 Executive Secretary, European Molecular Biology Organization (EMBO), Heidelberg
1982–1993 Scientific Co-ordinator European Molecular Biology Laboratory (EMBL), Heidelberg
1993–1994 Acting director general, EMBL 
1991–2015 Trustee of The Darwin Trust of Edinburgh
1994–2002 ICRF director of support services, Imperial Cancer Research Fund
2002–2003 Executive director of research integration and services, Cancer Research UK (formerly Imperial Cancer Research Fund)
2003–2005 Director of research services, Cancer Research UK
2005–2013 Vice president for scientific and facility operations, The Rockefeller University, New York, NY
2014 Retired

Editorships 
 1976–1980 Editor: Cancer Reviews, BBA, Elsevier North Holland
 1979–1985 Editor in chief: Trends in Biochemical Sciences (TIBS)
 1982–2003 Executive editor: The EMBO Journal
 1991–1999 Advisory editor, Bio Essays, Cambridge, UK
 1993–2003 Associate editor, European Journal of Cell Biology
 1993–2001 Editorial board, Structural Biology

References

Books published 
 
 
 
 
 
 
 

1938 births
Living people
People educated at Handsworth Grammar School
Alumni of Jesus College, Cambridge
Alumni of King's College London
Academics of King's College London
Fellows of the Royal Society
British emigrants to the United States
Rockefeller University faculty